Hylaeaicum is a genus of flowering plant in the family Bromeliaceae, native to tropical northern South America. The taxon was first described by Ernst Heinrich Georg Ule in 1935 as a subgenus of "Aregelia" (an illegitimate genus name). It was later treated as a subgenus of Neoregelia, before being raised to a full genus in 2021, a status accepted by both Plants of the World Online and the Encyclopaedia of Bromeliads.

Species
, Plants of the World Online accepted the following species:
Hylaeaicum eleutheropetalum (Ule) Leme & Forzza, syn. Neoregelia eleutheropetala
Hylaeaicum levianum (L.B.Sm.) Leme & Forzza, syn. Neoregelia leviana
Hylaeaicum margaretae (L.B.Sm.) Leme & Forzza, syn. Neoregelia margaretae 
Hylaeaicum meeanum (Reitz) Leme & Forzza, syn. Neoregelia meeana
Hylaeaicum mooreanum (L.B.Sm.) Leme, Zizka & Aguirre-Santoro, syn. Neoregelia mooreana
Hylaeaicum myrmecophilum (Ule) Leme & Forzza, syn. Neoregelia myrmecophila
Hylaeaicum pendulum (L.B.Sm.) Leme, Zizka & Aguirre-Santoro, syn. Neoregelia pendula
Hylaeaicum peruvianum (L.B.Sm.) Leme, Zizka & Aguirre-Santoro, syn. Neoregelia peruviana
Hylaeaicum roseum (L.B.Sm.) Leme, Zizka & Aguirre-Santoro, syn. Neoregelia rosea
Hylaeaicum stoloniferum (L.B.Sm.) Leme, Zizka & Aguirre-Santoro, syn. Neoregelia stolonifera
Hylaeaicum tarapotoense (Rauh) Leme, Zizka & Aguirre-Santoro, syn. Neoregelia tarapotoensis
Hylaeaicum wurdackii (L.B.Sm.) Leme, Zizka & Aguirre-Santoro, syn. Neoregelia wurdackii

References

Bromelioideae
Bromeliaceae genera